Saint-Saturnin (Auvergnat: Sent Sadornin) is a commune in the Puy-de-Dôme department in Auvergne in central France. Its 12th century Romanesque church is a listed monument.

See also
Communes of the Puy-de-Dôme department

References

Communes of Puy-de-Dôme
Plus Beaux Villages de France